Albert Clay Bilicke (June 22, 1861 – May 7, 1915) was a millionaire hotelier and builder in Los Angeles. Bilicke and his father ran the Cosmopolitan Hotel in Tombstone, Arizona. After it was destroyed by a fire in 1882 he moved to California. In Los Angeles he built the Hotel Alexandria (1906) and was president of the Alexandria Hotel Company. He partnered with Robert Rowan in a building company. He was presumed drowned after being lost at sea while a passenger on the Cunard liner RMS Lusitania which was sunk by a German torpedo off the coast of Ireland. His wife Gladys survived. 

His parents were German immigrants and his father was the proprietor of the Cosmopolitan Hotel in Tombstone, Arizona. Bilicke was born in Coos Bay, Oregon.

Bilicke was acquainted with Wyatt Earp and testified at his trial after the shooting at the O.K. Corral.

The Cosmopolitan was destroyed by a fire in 1882. A. C. Bilicke planned to rebuild it.

Bilicke bought the Hollenbeck Hotel in Los Angeles in 1893. He joined with Robert Rowan to form the Bilicke-Rowan Fireproof Building Company, a construction firm the built the Alexandria Hotel. The Rowan Building in Los Angeles is named for Rowan.

References

External links
 

1861 births
1915 deaths
American billionaires
American people of German descent
People from Coos Bay, Oregon
Businesspeople from Los Angeles
People from Tombstone, Arizona
19th-century American businesspeople
20th-century American businesspeople
American hoteliers
Deaths on the RMS Lusitania